The Book of Wei, also known by its Chinese name as the Wei Shu, is a classic Chinese historical text compiled by Wei Shou from 551 to 554, and is an important text describing the history of the Northern Wei and Eastern Wei from 386 to 550.  Widely regarded as the official and authoritative source historical text for that period, it is one of the Twenty-Four Histories.

Origin and reception 
The Northern Wei dynasty was established in 386 by the Tuoba clan. The greatest accomplishment of the Northern Wei dynasty was the unification of Northern China in 439. An internal struggle resulted in a split which introduced the Eastern Wei and the Western Wei. The Eastern Wei dynasty was short-lived. Established in 534, several military campaigns were fought to try and reunite east and west but each failed. In 550, the area was taken over by Gao Yang who founded his own dynasty which he names the Northern Qi. It is the history of these two dynasties that Wei Shou attempted to record.

In compiling the work, Wei Shou managed to withstand pressure, with the help of the Northern Qi emperor, from powerful elites who wanted him to glorify their otherwise disputed ancestral origins. Detractors of the work referred to the book as Hui Shu (穢書), nearly pronounced as 'Wei Shu', but meaning "Book of Filth". From a modern reader's perspective, the book had problems characteristic of other works in Twenty-Four Histories, as it praised the subject dynasty of interest (in this case the Northern Wei). It likely overstated the power of her predecessor state Dai, which was a vassal of Western Jin, Later Zhao, Former Yan, and Former Qin. Further, it retroactively used the sinicized surnames introduced by Emperor Xiaowen of Northern Wei in 496 to apply to events long before, making it difficult for readers to know what the actual names of historical personages were. In addition, Wei Shou was criticized in that, as an official of the Eastern Wei and its successor state Northern Qi, he included the sole emperor of Eastern Wei, Emperor Xiaojing, among his imperial lists while intentionally omitting the three emperors from the rival state Western Wei after the division of the Northern Wei in 534. However, he was credited with harmonizing highly confusing and fragmented accounts of historical events from the state of Dai to the early period of Northern Wei and creating coherent accounts of events.

Content
The content of the Book of Wei follows the format of previous standard histories. The first fifteen volumes are annals (紀) describing the lives and events of the emperors, with the first being a preface.

Annals (帝紀)

Volumes 13 through 104 are biographies beginning with Volume 13: Biographies of Empresses (皇后列傳) and ending with Volume 104: Author's Preface (自序). In his preface Wei Shou harmonizes the Xianbei cultural heritage with Han Chinese cultural heritage, arguing that the rise of the Northern Wei was mandated by Heaven and that the Xianbei people were descended from the Yellow Emperor.  Descriptions of figures from the historic Korean kingdoms of Goguryeo, Baekje, and also Khitan and many other historic nationalities are included in volumes 95 through 103.

Wei Shou also includeds postitve descriptions of the dialog between Confucianism, Buddhism, and Daoism. For example, in volume 69 where the court official Pei Yanjun (裴延隽; d. 528) describes a knowledge of both Buddhism and Confucianism as being beneficial to social administration. The whole of Volume 114, "Treatise on Buddhism and Daoism" (釋老志), of the Book of Wei is also related to this topic. Volumes 105 through 114 are treatises (志).

The book originally contains 114 volumes, but by the Song Dynasty some volumes were already missing. Later editors reconstructed those volumes by taking material from the History of the Northern Dynasties dated to the 7th century.

Translations
Dien translates parts of volume 59, which describes the dispute between the Northern Wei and Liu Song at Pengcheng. Lee translates part of volume 111 describing the case of Liu Hui (劉輝), who committed adultery while married to Princess Lanling (蘭陵公主).

See also
 Twenty-Four Histories
 Change of Xianbei names to Han names

References

Citations

Sources

External links

 Book of Wei 《魏書》 Chinese text with matching English vocabulary

Twenty-Four Histories
Northern Wei
Sixteen Kingdoms
6th-century history books
History books about the Northern and Southern dynasties
Southern and Northern Dynasties literature
6th-century Chinese books